Vítězslav Jaroš (born 23 July 2001) is a Czech professional footballer who plays as a goalkeeper for EFL League Two side Stockport County, on loan from Liverpool of the . He has previously spent time on loan at St Patrick's Athletic and Notts County.

Club career

Early career
Jaroš started out with his local club FK Příbram where he played for 3 years before joining Slavia Prague in 2011. He spent 6 years there before signing for Liverpool in 2017, joining the club's Academy set-up and winning the FA Youth Cup in his second season with the side.

In the summer of 2019, he made his first appearance for the senior side in a pre-season friendly against Tranmere Rovers, playing the second half of a 6–0 win. Shortly after that he picked up an injury in training that halted his progress, taking a knock to his elbow from close range that tore a ligament off the bone and a little bit of the bone away, with the injury requiring surgery that caused him to miss several months.

Liverpool
Jaroš first involvement with the Liverpool first team squad in a competitive fixture came in February 2020, when he was named on the bench for their FA Cup Fourth Round replay against Shrewsbury Town. He signed a new long term contract with the club on the 9th July 2020. The following season, Jaroš was on the bench again for three Champions League fixtures, at home and away against Ajax and away to FC Midtjylland, although he remained an unused substitute in all three.

St Patrick's Athletic loan
On February 3, 2021, it was announced that Jaroš had joined League of Ireland Premier Division side St Patrick's Athletic on loan for the duration of the 2021 season. This made him the second ever player from Czech Republic to sign for the club, after fellow Příbram native Michal Macek. He made his debut for St Pats, and his senior competitive debut, on the 19th March 2021, in a 1–1 draw with Shamrock Rovers in the Dublin derby at Tallaght Stadium. Jaroš' debut performance saw him draw high praise from his manager Stephen O'Donnell who stated "He’s shown tonight what he’s shown all pre-season. For a player so young, 19 years of age, to have such a good mentality and be so composed – if you were coming in and didn’t know his age, you’re saying: ‘That’s a seasoned veteran, that’s a real pro’." He kept the first clean sheet of his senior career on the 3rd April 2021, as his side won 1–0 away to Bohemians in the Dublin City derby at Dalymount Park to go top of the league. Jaroš went on to keep 5 clean sheets in 6 games as his side remained unbeaten after 9 games, conceding just 4 goals. On 12 November 2021, Jaroš was named as the club's Player of the Year, as voted by the club's supporters following a debut season that saw him help his side to a 2nd place finish, their best since the club's 2013 title win. On 28 November 2021 Jaroš made his last appearance for the club in the 2021 FAI Cup Final, beating rivals Bohemians 4–3 on penalties following a 1–1 draw after extra time in front of a record FAI Cup Final crowd of 37,126 at the Aviva Stadium. He departed the club at the end of the season, waiting for guidance from Jurgen Klopp on where his next move would be, with the Liverpool manager stating "Vit was brilliant in Ireland", while Pat's manager Stephen O'Donnell stated he was the best 20 year old goalkeeper he had ever seen, including Kasper Schmeichel who was a teammate of his at Falkirk at the same age. On 26 January 2022, it was announced that Jaroš had been named SWI Goalkeeper of the Year as voted by Irish journalists.

Notts County loan
On 27 January 2022, it was announced that Jaroš had signed for National League side Notts County until the end of the season. He made his debut for the club on 1 March 2022 in a 3–1 loss away to Chesterfield. His first clean sheet for the club came on his fifth appearance for the club, in a 2–0 win over Eastleigh at Meadow Lane on 19 February 2022. He made a total of 15 appearances for the club during his loan spell, as they missed out on promotion to EFL League Two in the playoffs.

Stockport County loan
On 4 July 2022, Jaroš signed for EFL League Two club Stockport County on a season long loan. Jaroš made his debut for the club on 9 August 2022 in an EFL Cup tie away to Harrogate Town in which he kept a clean sheet in a 1–0 win. He followed that up by keeping another clean sheet in a 1–0 win 4 days later in a victory at home to Colchester United in his league debut for the club. On 23 August 2022, Jaroš kept a clean sheet in a 0–0 draw with Premier League side Leicester City in an EFL Cup tie, also saving a penalty from James Maddison in the shootout as his side were defeated 3–1 on penalties.

International career
Jaroš has represented Czech Republic at various underage levels. His first callup to the Czech Republic U21 team came in September 2021. He made his debut for the Czech Republic U21s in a 3–0 win away to Andorra U21 on 29 March 2022.

Career statistics

Club

Honours

Club
Liverpool Youth
FA Youth Cup: 2018–19

St Patrick's Athletic
FAI Cup: 2021

Individual
St Patrick's Athletic Player of the Year: 2021

References

2001 births
Living people
People from Příbram
Czech footballers
Czech expatriate footballers
Association football goalkeepers
Czech Republic under-21 international footballers
Czech Republic youth international footballers
SK Slavia Prague players
Liverpool F.C. players
St Patrick's Athletic F.C. players
Notts County F.C. players
Stockport County F.C. players
League of Ireland players
National League (English football) players
English Football League players
Czech expatriate sportspeople in England
Expatriate association footballers in the Republic of Ireland